Armand J. R. Vaillancourt (born September 3, 1929) is a Canadian sculptor, painter and performance artist from Quebec. He is known for his public art fountain entitled Vaillancourt Fountain located in San Francisco. He lives in Montreal.

Biography
Armand J. R. Vaillancourt was born on September 3, 1929 in Black Lake, Quebec, Canada. He received his art training at the École des beaux-arts de Montréal.

In 1971, a publicly commissioned fountain entitled Vaillancourt Fountain, often called Québec libre!, was installed in the Embarcadero Plaza in San Francisco, United States. One of his best known sculptures, Québec libre! is representative of the relationship between Vaillancourt's art and his political convictions. It is a large concrete fountain, 200 feet long, 140 feet wide and 36 feet high sitting near the city's financial district at the Embarcadero Center. The night before its inauguration, Vaillancourt inscribed Québec libre! in red letters, to note his support for the Quebec sovereignty movement and more largely, his support for the freedom of all people. The following day, seeing that the city's employees erased the inscription, he jumped on the sculpture during its dedication to reinscribe the phrase.

On November 11, 1987, the fountain became the object of an incident involving U2's singer Bono. During a free concert, Bono climbed the sculpture to write, "Rock N Roll Stops Traffic", referring to the power of rock. Vaillancourt flew from Quebec to California after the incident, and spoke in favor of Bono's actions at U2's Oakland performance several days later. Vaillancourt said, "Good for him. I want to shake his hand. People get excited about such a little thing."

As of 2008, Vaillancourt lives in a 19th-century stone house in Montreal, across the street from Jeanne-Mance Park. His archives, consisting of 500 cardboard boxes on metal shelves, plus nearly 100 notebooks in which he records all of his activities, are stored on the second floor of his house. His art has a political motivation, and, in addition to Quebec independence, he is concerned about environmental issues such as pollution caused by exploitation of oil sands, the destruction of honey bee populations, and human rights issues such as the rights of indigenous peoples. He won the Prix Paul-Émile-Borduas, awarded by the Government of Quebec in 1993. In 2004, he was awarded the title of Chevalier of the Ordre national du Québec. In 2008, a retrospective of his work was exhibited at the Musée des beaux-arts de Mont-Saint-Hilaire in Mont-Saint-Hilaire, Quebec.

References

Sources 
 Grande, John K. Playing with Fire Armand Vaillancourt Social Sculptor - Zeitgeist; Montreal, Quebec, Canada, 1999
 Grande, John K. Jouer avec le feu; Armand Vaillancourt, Editions Lanctot; Montreal, Quebec, Canada 2001
 Grande, John K., Harper, Glenn, Sullivan, Francoise, Guy Sioui-Durandl, Armand Vaillancourt; Sculpture de Masse, Musee du Bas-St-Laurent, 2004

1929 births
Living people
Artists from Quebec
Canadian sculptors
Canadian male sculptors
New Democratic Party of Quebec candidates in Quebec provincial elections
People from Thetford Mines
Quebec sovereigntists
École des beaux-arts de Montréal alumni